The following is a list of members of the Governor of Ohio's Cabinet.  The cabinet of the Governor of Ohio includes the heads of the 26 departments of Ohio government established 
by statute.  They inform and assist the governor in the operation of the state. Each is appointed by the governor and affirmed by the Ohio General Assembly. 

Director of the Adjutant General's Department: Major General John C. Harris, Jr.
Director of the Ohio Department of Administrative Services: Director Robert Blair 
Director of the Ohio Department of Aging: Director Bonnie Kantor-Burman
Director of the Ohio Department of Agriculture: Director David T. Daniels
Chancellor of the Ohio Board of Regents: Chancellor John Carey
Director of the Office of Budget and Management: Tim Keen
Director of the Ohio Department of Commerce: Director Jacqueline T. Williams
Director of the Ohio Development Services Agency: David Goodman
Director of the Ohio Environmental Protection Agency: Craig W. Butler
Director of the Ohio Department of Health: Director Lance Himes  
Director of the Office of Information Technology: Chief Information Officer Stu Davis
Director of the Ohio Department of Insurance: Judith L. French

Director of the Ohio Department of Job and Family Services: Cynthia C. Dungey
Director of the Ohio Lottery Commission: Director Dennis Berg
Director of the Ohio Department of Mental Health and Addiction Services: Director Tracy J. Plouck
Director of the Ohio Department of Developmental Disabilities: Jeff Davis
Director of the Ohio Department of Natural Resources: James Zehringer
Director of the Ohio Department of Public Safety: John Born
Director of the Ohio Department of Rehabilitation and Correction: Gary C. Mohr
Commissioner of the Ohio Department of Taxation: Tax Commissioner Joe Testa
Director of the Ohio Department of Transportation: Jerry Wray
Director of the Ohio Department of Veterans Services: Deborah Ashenhurst
Administrator of the Ohio Bureau of Workers' Compensation: Steve Buehrer
Director of the Ohio Department of Youth Services: Harvey Reed

External links

Department of Administrative Services (DAS)
Department of Aging
Department of Agriculture
Department of Alcohol and Drug Addiction Services
Office of Budget and Management (OBM)
Department of Commerce
Department of Development
Department of Developmental Disabilities
Ohio Environmental Protection Agency (Ohio EPA)
Department of Health
Department of Health Transformation
Office of the Inspector General
Department of Insurance
Department of Job and Family Services
Department of Mental Health
Department of Natural Resources
Department of Public Safety
Public Utilities Commission
Regents
Department of Rehabilitation and Correction
Department of Taxation
Department of Transportation
Department of Veterans Services
Bureau of Workers' Compensation
Department of Youth Services

United States state cabinets
Ohio
Cabinet